Brett Bulmer (born April 26, 1992) is a Canadian professional ice hockey player. He is currently playing for Tilburg Trappers in the German Oberliga. Bulmer previously iced with the Nottingham Panthers and the Fife Flyers in the EIHL. He was selected by the Minnesota Wild in the second round (39th overall) of the 2010 NHL Entry Draft.

Playing career
On April 21, 2011, Bulmer was signed by the Minnesota Wild to a three-year entry-level contract. Bulmer made his NHL debut on opening night of the 2011–12 season on October 8, 2011. After playing in nine NHL games, in which he registered three assists, six penalty minutes, and a plus-one rating, the 19-year-old was returned to his junior team the Kelowna Rockets of the Western Hockey League to continue his development on October 31, 2011. Bulmer missed a portion of the 2012–13 AHL season due to injuries.

On December 12, 2013, Bulmer was recalled to the Minnesota Wild, he played in 5 games going scoreless, before he was reassigned to Iowa on December 20, 2013.

As an un-signed free agent from the Wild over the summer, Bulmer opted to continue his career abroad, signing mid-season deal with Finnish club, Ilves Tampere of the top tier Liiga on October 30, 2016. On February 6, 2017, he transferred to ERC Ingolstadt of the German DEL, signing a contract for the remainder of the 2016–17 campaign. Bulmer appeared in the final 7 regular season games with Ingolstadt, contributing with 3 points before suffering a preliminary playoff loss to the Fischtown Pinguins to conclude his tenure with ERC.

On September 28, 2017, Bulmer opted to continue his career back in North America, signing a one-year ECHL contract with the Florida Everblades.

Ahead of the 2018–19 season, Bulmer penned a one-year deal with British EIHL side Fife Flyers. In August 2019, Bulmer moved to Fife's Elite League counterparts Nottingham Panthers.

In February 2020, an issue with Bulmer's visa forced Nottingham to release him from his contract - although the club did not rule out the player returning for next season. Bulmer then joined DEL2 side EHC Freiburg, a side led by former Glasgow Clan coach Pete Russell.

After a 76-point season with Oberliga side Hannover Indians in 2020–21, Bulmer opted to remain in the German third tier and signed for Tilburg Trappers for the 2021–22 season.

Career statistics

References

External links

1992 births
Living people
Canadian ice hockey right wingers
ERC Ingolstadt players
EHC Freiburg players
Fife Flyers players
Florida Everblades players
Hannover Indians players
Houston Aeros (1994–2013) players
Ice hockey people from British Columbia
Ilves players
Iowa Wild players
Kelowna Rockets players
Minnesota Wild draft picks
Minnesota Wild players
Nottingham Panthers players
Tilburg Trappers players
Sportspeople from Prince George, British Columbia
Canadian expatriate ice hockey players in England
Canadian expatriate ice hockey players in Scotland
Canadian expatriate ice hockey players in Finland
Canadian expatriate ice hockey players in Germany
Canadian expatriate ice hockey players in the Netherlands
Canadian expatriate ice hockey players in the United States